Adjeil Glória Neves (born 7 October 1996), sometimes known as Mimi, is a footballer who plays as a left-back for Fabril. Born in Portugal, he represents the São Tomé and Príncipe national team.

International career
Neves made his professional debut with the São Tomé and Príncipe national team in a 2–0 2021 Africa Cup of Nations qualification loss to Sudan on 24 March 2021.

References

External links
 
 

1996 births
Living people
People from Alcochete
People with acquired São Tomé and Príncipe citizenship
São Tomé and Príncipe footballers
São Tomé and Príncipe international footballers
Portuguese footballers
Portuguese people of São Tomé and Príncipe descent
Association football fullbacks
Campeonato de Portugal (league) players
Sportspeople from Setúbal District